Matti Rautiainen (born 7 October 1955) is a Finnish ice hockey player. He competed in the men's tournament at the 1976 Winter Olympics.

References

External links
 

1955 births
Living people
KOOVEE players
Ilves players
Tappara players
Olympic ice hockey players of Finland
Ice hockey players at the 1976 Winter Olympics
Ice hockey people from Tampere